RNA, U4atac small nuclear (U12-dependent splicing) is a small nuclear RNA that in humans is encoded by the RNU4ATAC gene.

The small nuclear RNA (snRNA) encoded by this gene is part of the U12-dependent minor spliceosome complex. In addition to the encoded RNA, this ribonucleoprotein complex consists of U11, U12, U5, and U6atac snRNAs. The U12-dependent spliceosome is required for the splicing of approximately 700 specific introns in the human genome.

Genomics

The RNU4ATAC gene is located on chromosome 2 (2q14.2). It is a single copy gene that is embedded within an intron of the protein coding CLASP1 gene but is transcribed in the antisense direction from CLASP1.

Clinical importance

Defects in this gene are a cause of several human inherited syndromes all of which show autosomal recessive inheritance. These include  Taybi Linder syndrome (microcephalic osteodysplastic primordial dwarfism type 1 (MOPD1), Roifman syndrome and Lowry-Wood syndrome.

References

Further reading